Al-Salihiyah (also spelled Salhiyé) is a town in eastern Syria, administratively part of the Deir ez-Zor Governorate, located on the western bank of the Euphrates River, south of Deir ez-Zor. Nearby localities include al-Asharah, Mayadin and al-Muhasan to the north and Hajin and al-Jalaa to the south. According to the Syria Central Bureau of Statistics, al-Salihiyah had a population of 4,471 in the 2004 census. The village is located just next to the site of ancient Dura-Europos.

Syrian Civil War

In the Syrian civil war the town was located in the centre of the self-proclaimed caliphate of ISIL from early 2014 until December 2017. On 3 December 2017, Tiger Forces belonging to the Syrian government surrounded the town, who later captured  on 7 December. It was one of the last towns west of the Euphrates to be controlled by ISIL. 

In a counteroffensive on 13 December ISIL forces briefly recaptured the town, only to lose it again, along with all other territories gained in their counteroffensive when, three days later, a large Syrian army attack was launched on the western bank of Euphrates river.

References

Populated places in Abu Kamal District
Villages in Syria